Harley-Davidson was a pinball machine arcade game manufactured by Midway and released under the Bally label in February 1991. Barry Oursler and Mark Sprenger designed the pinball game utilizing the Williams Pinball Controller (Williams WPC) arcade system board platform. This was the first pinball game sold under the Bally label to use the Williams WPC system and their last to use an Alphanumeric Display.

Rules
Completing U-S-A lanes (red, white, and blue, with single direction lane change) advances the bonus multiplier, which goes up to 6x, and is never reset on factory difficulty. Clearing the lanes at 6x lights out lane extra ball. Thereafter, completing "USA" gives players a USA bonus that starts at 100,000 points, and increases by 100,000 each time it is collected, without limit.

There are two sets of drop targets: one on the far left (H-A-R) and one in the center (L-E-Y). Completing "HAR" lights the left spinner and completing "LEY" lights the right spinner, each of which scores 3,000 points per spin. Completing both scores and advances the HARLEY bonus (50,000, 100,000, 200,000, 300,000, and 500,000).

There are also the DAVIDSON stand ups. "D" is on the very left below the drops, "A" is between the left orbit and left eject and "V" is in the same spot on the right, and the remaining "IDSON" are along the right wall. Completing "DAVIDSON" lights the speed bonus at the right eject, a hurry-up that starts at 1 million points and increases by 1 million each time collected. Completing "DAVIDSON" twice on one ball lights the extra ball at the right eject. Jackpot will also light here, when players travel across America.

The left eject lights for 25,000 at start of game. Hitting this eject scores and advances the eject hole value (10,000, 25,000, 50,000, 100,000, and 150,000 plus ball lock). Upon locking a ball, right eject lights for lock which, if hit, starts multi-ball. During multi-ball, completing "HARLEY" and "DAVIDSON" scores 5 million, lights the orbit shots for 1 million each for the rest of multi-ball. The jackpot is not related to multi-ball. After the first multi-ball, the eject hole resets to 10,000, with no lights.

There is a third eject on the field below the "IDSON" stand ups which cannot be shot at directly. A ball can only bounce in by accident. This awards a "speed trap" provided it did not land in from a weak plunge, a random mystery value. This can be a score bonus, bonus advance, lighting the speed bonus, losing a tilt warning, a traffic ticket (lose 10,000 points), or an advance city bonus. Speed bonus, traffic tickets, and tilt warnings occur more frequently than the others. The game will always award instant multi-ball if a ball is locked. Locked balls can be stolen in this game. Speed trap is generally awarded only once per ball.

Like Fathom, the in-lanes are where the out-lanes should be, and vice versa. The in-lanes and out-lanes spell B-I-K-E. Lighting "BIKE" or changing spots in a city and scores the BIKE bonus (50,000). "B" and "I" light the right orbit, and "K" and "E" light the left orbit. Hitting a lighted orbit lets the ball go all the way around the loop and awards a city plus 50,000 points, just like spelling "BIKE." It also lights the orbit players have shot for one million. Shooting an unlighted orbit feeds the jets and then lights that orbit. Lighted orbits and millions shot time out after 10 or 15 seconds. Depending on speed, a ball that goes up a lighted orbit and back down is commonly awarded two cities and one city for the return trip. A ball that goes up and down an unlighted orbit will award one.

Lighting all cities lights jackpot. Jackpot has a minimum of 5 million points, and it is progressively increased by the jet bumpers. Subsequent jackpots are multiplied. Thus, the second jackpot is a double jackpot, the third is a triple jackpot, and so on.

Hitting an unlighted eject hole other than the left one, gives players a rest stop bonus which starts at 30,000 and goes up by 5,000 each time.

Sega/Stern version
Sega Pinball produced an unrelated Harley-Davidson pinball machine in 1999. It was designed by Jon Borg and Lonnie D. Ropp. The game went through three different production runs. The first made by Sega and continued by Stern Pinball in 1999 after they bought Sega's pinball division in the same year, the second produced by Stern Pinball in 2002, and the third with an artwork change also by Stern was released in 2004. The third version can be played on The Pinball Arcade.

References

External links 
 

1991 pinball machines
Bally pinball machines
Harley-Davidson